Omiostola delta is a species of moth of the family Tortricidae. It is found in Carchi Province, Ecuador.

The wingspan is about 26 mm. The ground colour of the forewings is creamish with leaden-grey suffusions and a darker costa with brownish-cream costal strigulae (fine streaks). The apex and posterior part of the costa are brownish. The markings consist of a dark purple-brown blotch edged with whitish. The hindwings are brownish.

Etymology
The species name refers to the shape of the dorsal blotch of the forewing.

References

	

Moths described in 2008
Olethreutini
Taxa named by Józef Razowski